CFND-FM is a French language community campus radio station that operates at 101.9 FM in Saint-Jérôme, Quebec, Canada.

Owned by Amie du Quartier, the station received CRTC approval in 2007.

The radio station is based at the École Notre-Dame, a primary school in Saint-Jérôme. The station's format, as per its license, is 23 hours of music, plus a 60-minute daily spoken word program, often broadcast during the school's lunch hour. All lunch time radio shows are prepared and presented by the students from grade 5 and 6.  During times that music is played, 65% of the selections are by francophone artists, with the formats varying between classic hits, blues, classical music and jazz. In addition, spoken word segments, comedy bits and documentaries produced by students is heard at various parts of the day.

References

External links
 École Notre-Dame CFND 101,9 FM
 

Fnd
Fnd
Fnd
Fnd
Saint-Jérôme
Radio stations established in 2007
2007 establishments in Quebec